Moving Violations is a 1985 comedy film based around a traffic school. Directed by Neal Israel, the film stars John Murray, Jennifer Tilly, Brian Backer, Sally Kellerman, Nedra Volz, Clara Peller, Wendie Jo Sperber, Fred Willard, and the film debut of Don Cheadle.

Synopsis
The film follows a group of people in Birch County, California (a fictionalized city/county that is similar to real-life Los Angeles) who, after being ticketed for numerous traffic violations (and hence losing their drivers' licenses, and vehicles to impounding), are ordered by Judge Nedra Henderson (Sally Kellerman) to attend a driving course to get their licenses and their vehicles back. However, the assigned teacher for this course, Deputy Henry "Hank" Halik (James Keach), is conspiring with the judge to execute a plan to ensure these offenders fail miserably, at all costs, so the corrupt duo can sell their impounded vehicles for their own personal gain. Clues lead one of the traffic offenders, landscaper Dana Cannon (John Murray), to discover their scheme, and he enlists his fellow students to help him stop it.

Cast
John Murray as Dana Cannon
Jennifer Tilly as Amy Hopkins 
James Keach as Deputy Henry 'Hank' Halik
Brian Backer as Scott Greeber
Sally Kellerman as Judge Nedra Henderson
Ned Eisenberg as Wink Barnes
Clara Peller as Emma Jean
Wendie Jo Sperber as Joan Pudillo
Nedra Volz as Mrs. Loretta Houk
Fred Willard as Terrence 'Doc' Williams
Lisa Hart Carroll as Deputy Virginia Morris
Nadine van der Velde as Stephanie McCarty
Ben Mittleman as Spencer Popodophalos
Don Cheadle as Juicy Burgers Worker
William Forward as Police Officer #1
Robert Conrad as Chief Robert A. Fromm (uncredited)
Willard E. Pugh as Jeff Roth
Dedee Pfeiffer as Cissy
Michael McManus as Farmer #1 (as Mike McManus)

Production
Writer and director Israel himself attended traffic school after having been pulled over by a police officer, for doing an illegal U turn:
"I made the mistake of arguing, and that was very foolish because the cop called in and found I had 13 tickets outstanding. Plus, I had one moving violation that I'd never settled. I went right to jail and did not collect $200. They put me in a cell with an arsonist. He had just blown somebody up. It was a very unsettling experience. I went to traffic school for a very long time, and I had to go to a whole lot of different courts with different jurisdictions. It was a real hassle. So, I suggested the idea of the film to Joe Roth, our producer, and he had just been to traffic school, too, so he thought it was great."
However he says "Traffic school is boring ... I interviewed a lot of people, including a man who owned a traffic school, but all his stories were boring. So, we made up everything."

Robert Conrad appeared in the film, unbilled, as a favor to Pat Proft, who was an old friend. A spokesman from the studio said, "We'd describe it as an uncredited star turn. It's no different from Robert de Niro in Brazil or Darren McGavin's part in The Natural, neither of which was mentioned in the credits."

Reception
The film was reviewed poorly by Janet Maslin at The New York Times, who described it as an "especially weak teen-age comedy, even by today's none-too-high standards." In a later appraisal, David Nusair of Reelfilm.com wrote that Moving Violations contains "enough laughs to be had here to warrant a mild recommendation."

See also
 List of American films of 1985

Notes

External links

 

1985 films
1980s teen comedy films
American teen comedy films
Films set in California
Films shot in California
Films shot in Los Angeles
20th Century Fox films
Films directed by Neal Israel
Films produced by Joe Roth
Films with screenplays by Neal Israel
1985 comedy films
1980s English-language films
1980s American films